Grogol Petamburan is a district (Indonesian kecamatan) of West Jakarta, Indonesia, roughly bounded by the West Flood Canal to the east, Angke Canal to the west and to the north, and Jakarta-Merak Tollway to the south. It has an area 1,130 ha. As of 2004, the use of the land was 58.0% for housing, 12.5% for offices, 3.8% in parkland, and 2.2% in farmland with the remainder in other uses or idle.

Some of the largest malls in Jakarta — Ciputra, Taman Anggrek and Central Park — are located in Grogol Petamburan's Tanjung Duren Selatan Administrative Village. The universities of Tarumanegara and Trisakti are also located in Grogol Petamburan, in Tomang Administrative Village.

Administrative villages
Grogol Petamburan is divided into seven Kelurahan (populations as of 2004):
Tomang (188 ha), with a population of 36,300 - area code 11440
Grogol (122 ha), with a population of 27,896- area code 11450
Jelambar (144 ha), with a population of 42,036 - area code 11460
Jelambar Baru (144 ha), with a population of 36,239 - area code 11460
Wijaya Kusuma (261 ha), with a population of 26,790 - area code 11460
Tanjung Duren Utara (134), with a population of 27,851 - area code 11470
Tanjung Duren Selatan (137 ha), with a population of 21,301 - area code 11470

List of important places 
Podomoro City
Ciputra Shopping Mall
Taman Anggrek Shopping Mall
Central Park Shopping Mall
Tarumanegara University
Trisakti University
Krida Wacana Christian University

References

West Jakarta
Districts of Jakarta